Goniobranchus aureopurpureus is a species of very colourful sea slug, a dorid nudibranch, a marine gastropod mollusk in the family Chromodorididae.

Distribution
This species was described from the coast of China. It is reported from many localities in the central Indo-Pacific Ocean from the west coast of Australia to Japan and the Marshall Islands.

References

External links
 

Chromodorididae
Gastropods described in 1881